{{Taxobox
| image = The rusts of Australia, their structure, nature, and classification (1906) (14587641697).jpg
| image_caption = E. tepperianum on Acacia armata & A. pycnantha| regnum = Fungi
| divisio = Basidiomycota
| classis = Pucciniomycetes
| ordo = Pucciniales
| familia = Pileolariaceae
| genus = Uromycladium| genus_authority = McAlpine (1905)
| type_species = Uromycladium simplex| type_species_authority = McAlpine (1905)
| subdivision_ranks = Species
| subdivision = ~11
}}Uromycladium is a genus of rust fungi in the family Pileolariaceae. It was circumscribed by mycologist Daniel McAlpine in 1905. The genus was established by McAlpine for rusts on Acacia (Fabaceae, subfamily Mimosoideae) with teliospores that clustered at the top of a pedicel.Doungsa-ard, C., McTaggart, A.R., Geering, A.D.W., Dalisay, T.U., Ray, J. Shivas, R.G. 2015. Uromycladium falcatarium sp. nov., the cause of gall rust on Paraserianthes falcataria in south-east Asia. Australasian Plant Pathol. 44: 25–30. DOI 10.1007/s13313-014-0301-z

The genus contains at least 11 species. Some of these species infect plants in the family Mimosoideae including Acacia, Paraserianthes and Falcataria. Most species are considered to be specific to only one host species of plant, such as Uromycladium simplex on Acacia pycnantha and Uromycladium falcatarium on Falcataria moluccana. Uromycladium tepperianum, on the other hand, has almost 100 known hosts including plants from several tribes of Mimosoideae. However, research suggests that this species may comprise several unrecognized taxa with narrower host ranges.Morris MJ (1987) Biology of the Acacia gall rust, Uromycladium tepperianum. Plant Pathol 36:100–106

Species
Species include:Uromycladium acaciae (Cooke) P.Syd. & Syd., 1914.Uromycladium alpinum McAlpine, 1906.Uromycladium bisporum McAlpine, 1906.Uromycladium cubense Arthur & J.R.Johnst., 1918.Uromycladium falcatarium Doungsa-ard, et al., 2015. Present in Philippines, Malaysia, Indonesia, and Timor LesteUromycladium fusisporum (Cooke & Massee) Savile, 1971. Present in AustraliaUromycladium maritimum McAlpine, 1905.Uromycladium naracoortensisUromycladium notabile (F.Ludw.) McAlpine, 1906. Present in AustraliaUromycladium robinsonii McAlpine, 1906. Present in AustraliaUromycladium simplex McAlpine, 1905. Present in AustraliaUromycladium tepperianum (Sacc.) McAlpine, 1905. Present in Australia, Philippines, Malaysia, Indonesia, Timor Leste. Introduced to South Africa.

Ecology

The rust fungi in the genus Uromycladium typically form enlarged galls at the end of actively growing plant tissues. These galls can be a significant disease limiting the growth and survival of trees planted for commercial tree plantations and agroforestry. The acacia gall rust fungus species Uromycladium tepperianum has been introduced to South Africa as a biological control on the invasive Australian shrub Acacia saligna.

The galls of Uromycladium tepperianum have been reported to be used by moths in the families Gracillariidae, Tortricidae, Tineidae, Pyralidae, and Stathmopodidae as food sources and domatium for their larvae in Australia. Specifically in the family Gracillariidae the species Polysoma eumetalla and Conopomorpha heliopla are found feeding on the surface of various species of acacia rust galls. Erechthias mystacinella and Opogona comptella moth larvae from the family Tineidae have been reported to live and feed on the inside of Uromycladium tepperianum'' galls.

References

External links

Uromycladium on Encyclopedia of Life

Basidiomycota genera
Pucciniales
Taxa named by Daniel McAlpine
Taxa described in 1905